The Great Yorkshire Run is an annual 10K run road race previously held in September in Sheffield City Centre, England, and now held in July in Harrogate, North Yorkshire.  It is a part of the Great Run series of events, and as such is linked with the Great North Run.  It was run for the first time in 2007, and was run over a weekend, with the mini (3–8-year-olds) race at 2 km and the Junior (9–14-year-olds) race at 3 km taking place on 6 September at Don Valley Stadium, with the full 10 km Great Yorkshire Run taking place on the Sunday. It was formerly supported by the city development company Creative Sheffield, and the regional development agency Yorkshire Forward. From July 2016, the Great Yorkshire Run is now sponsored by Theakston Brewery and is referred to as the Great Yorkshire Run - Harrogate in association with Theakston.

Past winners

Key:

References 

10K runs
Athletics competitions in England
Recurring sporting events established in 2007
2007 establishments in England
Annual sporting events in the United Kingdom
Annual events in England
Sport in Harrogate